"My Prairie Song Bird" is 1909 popular song composed by George W. Meyer and with lyrics written by Jack Drislane. In the song, the singer is asking Prairie Song Bird to marry him. The chorus is:

Early recordings
Burr & Stanley, Victor 16560 (1910).

References

Bibliography
Drislane, Jack (w.); Meyer, George W. (m.). "My Prairie Song Bird" (Sheet music). New York: F.B. Haviland Publishing Co. (1909).
Kinkle, Roger D. The Complete Encyclopedia of Popular Music and Jazz, 1900-1950. New York: Arlington House (1974).

1909 songs
Songs written by George W. Meyer